Parrots are birds found mostly in tropical and subtropical regions.

Parrot may also refer to:

Businesses
 Parrot SA, a French company which produces wireless products and drones
 Parrot Corporation, a British floppy disk manufacturer
 Parrot Records, American record label, a division of London Records
 Parrot Records (blues label),  American Chicago-based record label
 Parrot Speed Fastener Company, original name of Swingline, a manufacturer of staplers and hole punches

Computing
 Parrot virtual machine, an interpreter currently being developed for Perl 6 and other dynamic programming languages
 Parrot assembly language, an assembly language used to program the virtual machine
 Parrot Security OS, a penetration-testing operating system

People
 Parrot (surname)
 Parrot Chaak, ruler of La Mar, an ancient Maya settlement

Other uses
 Parrot, Kentucky, an unincorporated community
 Parrot (crater), a lunar impact crater
 CZAW Parrot, a Czech light-sport aircraft
 UP Parrots, a former name of the UP Fighting Maroons, the varsity teams of the University of the Philippines
 Parrot, a title character of Parrot and Olivier in America, a 2009 novel by Peter Carey

See also 
 
 
 Parrot Cay, an island in the Turks and Caicos Islands
 Parrott (disambiguation)
 Parott, a type of bread in Kashmiri cuisine
 Parrotbill, an Old World passerine bird of the family Paradoxornithidae
 Parrotfish, a Perciformes marine fish of the family Scaridae, and two other fish, the blood parrot and the parrot cichlid